The municipality of Zlatitsa is a municipality in Sofia Province, Bulgaria. It is made up of two disjoint areas: one consisting of the territory of the town of Zlatitsa and the neighbouring village of Karlievo, and another one centred on the village of Petrich to the south-west, which is separated by the territory of the intervening Chavdar Municipality. The municipality has a population of 5,077 (according to a 2019 estimate).

References 

Municipalities in Sofia Province